This is a list of Albanian film directors.

Male directors
 Gëzim Erebara (1929-2007)
 Hysen Hakani (1932-2011)
 Kristaq Dhamo (1933)
 Saim Kokona (1934)
 Dhimitër Anagnosti (1936)
 Ibrahim Muçaj (1944-2010)
 Saimir Kumbaro (1945)
 Kujtim Gjonaj (1946)
 Kristaq Mitro (1948)
 Isa Qosja (1949)
 Kujtim Çashku (1950)
 Edmond Budina (1952)
 Zehrudin Dokle (1952)
 Leon Qafzezi (1953)
 Shaqir Veseli (1957)
 Besnik Bisha (1958)
 Xhovalin Delia (1959)
 Arian Çuliqi (1960)
 Gjergj Xhuvani (1963)
 Valmir Tertini (1993)

Female directors
 Xhanfize Keko (1928-2007)
 Shqipe N. Duka (1980)
 Luljeta Hoxha
 Drita Koci

Albanian-American directors
 Stan Dragoti (1932)
 Thomas Logoreci
 Vilma Zenelaj
 Greta Zenelaj

References

Albanian film directors